The Panchkula Welfare Trust was set up in 1999 by a group of 15 philanthropists in Panchkula, Haryana, India.

Trustees
The trust was founded by 15 members to serve the society of Panchkula and nearby areas. The list of trustees is as follows:
Dr. Naresh Mittal, House No 212, Sector 6, Panchkula
Er. Sham Lal Garg
Er. Kulbhooshan Goyal
Sh. Satish Jain
Sh. Raj Kumar Gupta
Sh. Mahesh Garg
Sh. Pawan Kumar Katia
Sh. Baldev Bansal
Sh. Bhupinder Goyal
Sh. Madan Gopal
Sh. Mithan Lal Singla
Sh. Pawan Kumar
Sh. RK Goyal
Er. SP Singla
Sh. Suneel Gupta

Charitable Diagnostic Centre
The trust has set up a 'Charitable Diagnostic Centre' in the city of Panchkula to provide quality, ethical, timely and affordable medical diagnostic services to society. The Centre works on a 'No Profit No Loss' basis and provides diagnostic services to the people at almost one third of the market rates. The Centre provides the following services:
 1. CT Scan Spiral
 2. Computerized ECG
 3. Colour Dopplers
 4. EEG
 5. Ultrasound
 6. Mammography
 7. Two Digital X-ray with Image Intensifier
 8. Axsym fully Automatic System for Hormones Drug Analysis
 9. Hitachi Random Access Bio-Chemistry Fully Automatic Analyzer
 10. Fully Automatic Blood Cell Counter

The Centre has served over 5 lakhs people (500,000 persons) since its day of opening.

Panchkula Gaushala Trust has been set up by same trustees to serve the stray cattle. The land was donated by Mata Mansa Devi Board. The Trust members have contributed the capital amount to set up world class gaushala at Mata Mansa Devi Temple. The gaushala is currently habdking 600 cows( all of these have are stray cattle collected by Municipal Corporation, Panchkula).

Future plans
The trust now plans to introduce additional services such as MRI and educational facilities to students.

The trust is also working with the Government of Haryana to adopt clinics and manage these more efficiently.

References

Non-profit organisations based in India
1999 establishments in Haryana